Johann Jakob von Tschudi (25 July 1818 – 8 October 1889) was a Swiss naturalist, explorer and diplomat.

Biography
Tschudi was born in Glarus to Johann Jakob Tschudi, a merchant, and Anna Maria Zwicky. He studied natural sciences and medicine at the universities of Neuchâtel, Leiden and Paris. In 1838 he travelled to Peru, where he remained for five years exploring and collecting plants in the Andes. He went to Vienna in 1843. In 1845 he described 18 new species of South American reptiles. Between 1857 and 1859 he visited Brazil and other countries in South America.

In 1860 he was appointed Swiss ambassador to Brazil, remaining so until 1868, and again spent time exploring the country and collecting plants for the museums of Neuchâtel, Glarus, and Freiburg. In 1868 he became minister to Vienna.

Peru
He wrote a textbook on Peru called Peruvian antiquities in which he recorded various aspects of Peruvian life and history. In his book he explained the various skull angles of Peruvians in the context of the Angle of Camper. Tschudi claimed that Camper's facial angles were an "important angle in anthropology", whose "greater or less opening indicates the intellectual superiority of a race, and, up to a certain point, of individuals". He went on to explain that he had obtained for his personal collection the mummified foetus of a woman at seven months found in the cave of "Huichay" ("two leagues from Tarma"), and included two engravings of it, to prove that the shape of the cranium of the Huancas was not due to pressures placed upon the cranium after birth for cultural reasons.

Legacy
Tschudi is commemorated in the scientific names of a species of venomous South American coral snake, Micrurus tschudii. and the montane guinea pig (Cavia tschudii),

Works
 Classification der Batrachier, mit Berucksichtigung der fossilen Thiere dieser A btheilung der Reptilien (Neuchâtel, 1838)
Untersuchungen über die Fauna Perus (St. Gall, 1844–47)
 "Reptilium conspectus quae in Republica Peruana reperiuntur et pleraque observata vel collecta sunt in itinere". Archiv für Naturgeschichte 11 (1): 150–170. (Berlin, 1845) (in Latin)
 Peruanische Reiseskizzen während der Jahre 1838-42 (2 vols., 1846)
 Die Ketchua-Sprache (3 vols., Vienna, 1853)
 Reise durch die Andes von Südamerika (Gotha, 1860)
 Die brasilianische Provinz Minas-Geraes (1863)
 Reisen durch Südamerika (5 vols., 1866–69)
 Organismus der Khets̆ua-Sprache (Leipzig 1884)
He also edited, in association with Mariano Eduardo de Rivera, Antigüedades Peruanas (Vienna, 1851; translated by F. L. Hawks, New York, 1853).

Notes

References

Further reading
"Johann Jakob von Tschudi," in Tom Taylor and Michael Taylor, Aves: A Survey of the Literature of Neotropical Ornithology, Baton Rouge: Louisiana State University Libraries, 2011.

External links
 
 

1818 births
1889 deaths
Swiss naturalists
Swiss nobility
Swiss ornithologists
Swiss explorers
Swiss Protestants
People from the canton of Glarus
Incan scholars
Swiss diplomats
Ambassadors of Switzerland to Brazil